Stuart Malawer is an international trade lawyer, and distinguished service professor of law at George Mason University's Schar School of Policy and Government. He was a founding faculty member of both the Antonin Scalia Law School and Schar School of Policy and Government at George Mason University.

Education 
Malawer completed an undergraduate degree at the University at Buffalo before attending Cornell Law School for his JD, and later the Wharton School at the University of Pennsylvania for a PhD in International Relations. He also earned a diploma from the Research Centre of The Hague Academy of International Law in the Netherlands, and studied at St Peter's College, Oxford and the Harvard Law School.

Legal work 
Malawer served as an international expert in the areas of trade law and foreign policy, testifying before international organizations including the World Trade Organization. He also served as an arbitrator for the American Arbitration Association (International Panel) 

Malawer formerly served as Chairman of the International Practice Section of the Virginia State Bar. In 2009 he was named to the Board of Directors of the Virginia Economic Development Partnership by Virginia Governor Tim Kaine and confirmed by the Virginia General Assembly. In addition, he was later appointed by Virginia Governor Terry McAuliffe and reappointed by Virginia Governor Ralph Northam to the Virginia Committee of International Trade at the VEDP.

He is a member of the Virginia State Bar and the New York State Bar.

Academic career 
He is currently the Distinguished Service Professor of Law & International Trade at the Schar School of Policy and Government at George Mason University. He is widely published as an authority in the area of international trade law. In 1976 Malawer became a founding faculty member of the George Mason School of Law (today the Antonin Scalia Law School) and subsequently the School of Public Policy. 

He is the founder and former director of the Graduate International Transactions Program at George Mason University. https://schar.gmu.edu/programs/masters-programs/masters-global-commerce-and-policy

He is the founder and former director of the St. Peters - George Mason Oxford Trade Program. https://globaltraderelations.net/images/Oxford_-_Geneva_Trade_Programs_Photos_1994-2003.pdf   Where he was Visiting Professor at St. Petr's College, Oxford University He has previously taught at the Wharton School and the Harvard International Tax Program.

He is the American editor of the Korean published China and WTO Review.

Awards 
Distinguished Faculty Member of the Year - George Mason University.

Hardy Cross Dillard Award (Virginia State Bar) (International Practice Section). https://www.vsb.org/site/sections/internationalpractice

Distinguished Service Award (Virginia State Bar) (Virginia Lawyer). https://www.vsb.org/

Malawer-Paden Founders Scholarship. https://www.gmu.edu/

Publications
"Biden's Trade Policies -- Year One: Same as Trump's or More Aggressive?" (China and WTO Review 2022).

TRUMP AND TRADE -- POLICY AND LAW (HeinOnline 2021).

"Biden, National Security, Law and Global Trade: Less Subterfuge and More Strategy." (China and WTO Review 2021).

"Trump, Recent Court Cases and the 2020 Presidential Election." (China and WTO Review 2020).

"Trump, Litigation and Threats: From Queens to the World Stage." (China and WTO Review 2020).

Trump, Trade and Federal Courts. (China and WTO Review 2019).

Trump's Tariff Wars and National Security (China and WTO Review 2018).

Trump's One-Year Trade Policies.(China and WTO Review 2018).

Trump's China Trade Policies (China and WTO Review 2017).

Global Trade and International Law (Hein and Company 2013).

U.S. National Security Law and Policy (Hein and Company 2009).

WTO Law, Litigation and Policy (Hein and Company 2007).

Essays on International Law.(Hein and Company 1986).

Federal Regulation of International Business (5 volumes)(U.S. Chamber of Commerce and Georgetown University)(1981–1983).

Studies in International Law.(Hein and Company 1977).

Imposed Treaties and International Law.''(Hein and Company 1977).

References

External links
Website - International Law
Website — International Trade Relations
Blog — Global Trade Relations
Malawer's Homepage at George Mason University.
A Dialogue with an International Lawyer -- Dr. Malawer. (Journal of East Asia and International Law (2018).

International law scholars
Living people
Year of birth missing (living people)
George Mason University faculty
Alumni of St Peter's College, Oxford